Jeannie Mai-Jenkins (born Jeannie Camtu Mai) is an American television host and stylist best known for her work on the makeover show How Do I Look? and the syndicated daytime talk show The Real. As a fashion expert, she is frequently featured on television programs such as Today, Extra TV, Entertainment Tonight, and Insider. She has also appeared as a host for E! as well as a red carpet host for the American Music Awards and as a correspondent for the Miss Universe pageant. She is currently a sideline reporter on Holey Moley on ABC.

Early life
Jeannie Mai was born and raised in San Jose, California, to a Chinese Vietnamese father and a Vietnamese mother. She attended Milpitas High School.

Career

1997–2004
At age 18, Mai launched her career as a makeup artist for MAC Cosmetics while still living in San Jose. As a trainer, she worked her way from face to face until she was eventually traveling the world to work for celebrities such as Christina Aguilera and Alicia Keys. This led her to also serve as a celebrity-makeup stylist for MTV's Total Request Live, KCAL Los Angeles, and Good Day Sacramento.

In 2003, Mai began auditioning for local-television networks with self-written scripts to demonstrate her hosting talents. She was hired to co-host the Asian-American magazine-style show Stir, on the International Channel. Later, the San Francisco-based California Music Channel hired her to host her own music countdown. Mai went on to become an entertainment reporter and producer of the WB's The Daily Mixx.

In 2005, Mai landed her first primetime hosting role on Character Fantasy on the USA Network, where she inspired guests each week to live their fantasies. Following this, she moved to Los Angeles to appear on MTV's Granted alongside Frankie Muniz and hosted segments related to fashion and entertainment news on networks such as E!, Lifetime, TLC, and NBC on the lattermost's talk morning program Today. She also started appearing as a member of the beauty squad on TLC's 10 Years Younger. In 2008, Mai hosted TLC's Miss America Reality Check. She also starred in the makeover special Dude, Where's Your Style, and became spokesperson of the cosmetics Never Accept Ordinary. The following year, Mai became host of the Style Network's fashion makeover show How Do I Look?. She also served as a correspondent and weekend host on NBC's Extra TV with Mario Lopez. In the digital realm, Mai was the resident contributor to Perez Hilton's fashion site Cocoperez.com. In 2011, Mai began hosting the Miss Universe pageant and was a fashion consultant on the NBC weight-loss competition The Biggest Loser. Furthermore, Mai also hosted the stylist competition The Next Style Star from Maker Studios, and was the digital correspondent for NBC's Fashion Star. In 2012, she appeared as a guest judge on Asia's Next Top Model, Cycle 1.

2013–present
In 2013, Mai was the host of a live weekly series titled Style Pop on the Style Network. From 2013-2022, Mai served as a co-host of the syndicated daytime talk show The Real, originally alongside Adrienne Bailon, Tamar Braxton, Loni Love, and Tamera Mowry, which premiered on July 15, 2013. Following a trial summer run during 2013 on the Fox Television Stations group, it was picked up to series the following year. In 2018, Mai and her co-hosts won the Daytime Emmy Award for Outstanding Entertainment Talk Show Host for their work. In 2015, Mai was host of the reality competition Steampunk'd on GSN. She also was a fashion correspondent on Entertainment Tonight.

In 2016, she brought her show How Do I Look? to Asia's Diva network. The following year, she portrayed Lady Luck on the American game show The Joker's Wild. Mai also became an ambassador for ReimagineMyself.com a program encouraging people living with relapsing multiple sclerosis (MS) to reimagine life with the chronic disease.

On September 2, 2020, Mai was announced as one of the celebrities competing on the 29th season of Dancing with the Stars. She was forced to exit the show on November 2, 2020, after being diagnosed with epiglottitis, an inflammatory condition that can cause swelling and block airflow to the lungs.

On October 18, 2022, she was announced as host of America's Test Kitchen: The Next Generation, which premiered on December 9, 2022.

On January 4, 2023, Mai and former Miss Universe Olivia Culpo were announced as hosts for the 71st Miss Universe pageant to be held at New Orleans, Louisiana on January 14.

Personal life
Mai is a Christian. She married Freddy Harteis on August 11, 2007; the couple divorced in December 2018.

In November 2018, Mai started dating rapper Jay "Jeezy" Jenkins. The couple married in 2021 in an intimate ceremony at their home in Atlanta, Georgia. In January 2022, the couple announced that she had given birth to a daughter.

Awards and nominations

References

External links
 
 

American Christians
American people of Chinese descent
American people of Vietnamese descent
American television talk show hosts
Christians from California
Living people
People from Milpitas, California
1979 births